Keith White may refer to:

 Keith White (yachtsman), disabled British solo yachtsman
 Keith White (footballer) (born 1934), Australian rules footballer
 Keith White (speedway rider) (born 1958), former international speedway rider in the United Kingdom